The  is an established national green party in Japan.

After the electoral success of Green activist Ryuhei Kawada in the 2007 House of Councillors election, the local green political network Rainbow and Greens had reportedly decided to dissolve itself and merge with the Japan Greens in December 2007. The two precedent organizations dissolved themselves and relaunched as Greens Japan, a political organization in late 2008, under its former Japanese name, Midori no Mirai (みどりの未来 - "green future").

History
The party was founded in July 2012 and held its first general assembly in that same month.

Representation
The party has a number of elected city council members/councillors in towns and cities across Japan. On the 22 November 2010, Kazumi Inamura became the first popularly elected Greens Japan Mayor, in the city of Amagasaki. As well as being the youngest mayor elected in Japan’s history at the age of 38, she is also the first popularly elected female mayor of the city. She won the mayoralty with 54% of the vote.

Party establishment
On 28 July 2012, the party was officially re-established under its new name by local assembly members and civic groups to run in the Upper House election. Two of the core policies of the party at launch were to reduce, and ultimately terminate Japan's nuclear power generation, and oppose the nation's entry into the Trans-Pacific Partnership (TPP).

See also
 Energy in Japan
 Environmental issues in Japan
 Nuclear power in Japan

References

External links
Midori no Tō (Greens Japan) (official website)
News articles
New Green Party formed in Japan/Group seeks to reflect anti-nuclear, environmental, pro-democracy movements  (Article in Green Pages, newspaper of the Green Party of the United States. September 2012).

2008 establishments in Japan
2012 establishments in Japan
Anti-nuclear organizations
Environmentalism in Japan
Global Greens member parties
Green parties in Asia
Political parties in Japan

fr:Les Verts (Japon)